The  Washington Redskins season was the franchise's 34th season in the National Football League (NFL) and their 29th in Washington, D.C. After dropping their first five, the Redskins won two-thirds of their remaining games to finish again at 6–8, fourth in the Eastern Conference.

NFL Draft

Schedule

Standings

Washington
Washington Redskins seasons
Washing